Kochkarinsky is a rural locality (a khutor) in Yaminskoye Rural Settlement, Alexeyevsky District, Volgograd Oblast, Russia. The population was 175 as of 2010.

Geography 
Kochkarinsky is located on the left bank of the Buzuluk River, 10 km northeast of Alexeyevskaya (the district's administrative centre) by road. Bolshoy Babinsky is the nearest rural locality.

References 

Rural localities in Alexeyevsky District, Volgograd Oblast